Jade is an ornamental stone.

Jade may also refer to:

People
 Jade (given name), including lists of people and fictional characters
 Jade (producer) (born c. 1978), Hungarian musical artist
 Jade (wrestler) (Stephanie Bell; born 1989), also known as Mia Yim
 Celina Jade (born 1985), actress
 Ms. Jade (born c. 1978), American rapper
 Claude Jade (1948-2006), stage name of French actress Claude Marcelle Jorré
 Mikaela Jade, Australian entrepreneur
 Samantha Jade (born 1987), Australian singer

Places 
 Jade (river), a river in northern Germany
 Jade, Germany, a municipality
 Jade, Karnataka, a village in India
 Côte de Jade, a coastal region of western France
 Jade City, British Columbia, Canada

Arts and entertainment

Characters
 Mara Jade, in the Star Wars universe
 Jade (Mortal Kombat)
 Jade (DC Comics)
 Jade (El Clon)
 Jade (Beyond Good & Evil)

Film and television 
 Jade (film), a 1995 William Friedkin film
 My Binondo Girl also known as Jade, a 2011 Philippine romantic comedy television drama
 TVB Jade, a television channel in Hong Kong

Music

Groups
 The Jades, a 1950s doo-wop American group, featuring Lou Reed
 Jade (UK band), a 1970s folk-rock band
 Jade (R&B group), a 1990s R&B group
 The Jades (Irish band), a 2000s all-female rock group

Albums
 Jade (Corey Hart album), 1998
 Jade (Flowing Tears album), 2000
 Jade (Sweetbox album), 2002
 Jade, an album by Jimsaku, 1992

Songs
 "Jade" (song), a 2011 song by X Japan
 "Jade", a 1973 single by Ronnie Hazlehurst
 "Jade", a 1981 B-side by China Doll
 "Jade", a song from Jade (Corey Hart album)
 "Jade", a song from Jade (Flowing Tears album)
 "Jade", a 1996 song by Hans Zimmer from The Rock soundtrack
 "Jade", a 2016 song by Mike Posner from At Night, Alone

Toys
 Jade (Bratz), one of the four original Bratz dolls

Technology
 JADE (cypher machine), a Japanese cipher-machine of the early 1940s
 Jade (DSSSL processor), a processor for the Document Style Semantics and Specification Language (DSSSL)
 JADE (particle detector), a particle detector at DESY, Hamburg
 JADE (planning system) (Joint Assistant for Development and Execution), an automated planning system of the U.S. military
 JADE (programming language), an object-oriented platform developed by the Jade Software Corporation
 Jade, the former name of the Pug JavaScript templating engine; see Comparison of web template engines
 Java Agent Development Framework
 Joint Approximation Diagonalization of Eigen-matrices, an algorithm for independent component analysis by JF Cardoso
 Jade engine, a video-game software developed by Ubisoft
 Jovian Auroral Distributions Experiment, an instrument suite on the Juno Jupiter orbiter

Other uses
 Jade (color)
 Jade Cargo International, a cargo airline
 Jade plant
 Jade / Jade II, a variety of green beans

See also
 Jade Dynasty (disambiguation)
 Jade Emperor, a Taoist god
 Jade Mountain (disambiguation)
 Jade Tree (disambiguation)
 
 Jadeite (disambiguation)